Naila Zaman Khan is a Bangladeshi neurologist. She was the founder head of the Department of Pediatric Neuroscience, Dhaka Shishu(Children's) Hospital, Bangladesh Institute of Child Health in 1992, till 2018. She is the founder chairperson of the "Shishu Bikash Network"(SBN), General Secretary of the "Bangladesh Protibondhi Foundation" (BPF), Secretary General of the Bangladesh Society for Child Neurology, Development and Disability (BSCNDD) and  Chairperson of the Bangladesh Society of Pediatric Neuro Electro- Physiologists (BSPNEP), and National Delegate of the Asia Oceania Child Neurology Association (ACCNA). From 2008 to 2018 she was the National Co-ordinator, Ministry of Health, for the establishment of multidisciplinary Child Development Centers in government tertiary and secondary hospitals.

Education
Naila Zaman passed Secondary School Certificate (SSC) from Dhaka board at 1968. In 1970, She completed Higher Secondary School Certificate (HSC). In 1977, She completed her M.B.B.S degree from Dhaka Medical College. She was awarded Fellowship (FCPS) from Bangladesh College of Physicians and Surgeons in 1984. She completed her PhD at Neurosciences Unit, Institute of Child Health, University of London In 1991.

International memberships

 1994-2007 National Secretary, Rehabilitation International.
 2004-till date National Delegate, Asia Oceania Child Neurology Association (AOCNA).

Career
Naila Zaman Khan has been involved with various national issues which is an outcome of her clinical work and research, through health activism, community engagement and socio-political forums. She brought the issue of lead poisoning through leaded petrol into the limelight with her findings. This resulted in the banning of leaded petrol by the government within a few weeks. From 1994 till date she has been actively involved with the Sammilita Nari Samaj to protest against state violence against women and children, and to formulate laws to protect them. She spoke out against injustice. She called for the formation of an EC by law in 2021 And he demanded that former Prime Minister Khaleda Zia take the necessary steps to go abroad for speedy treatment in 2021.

Professional experience

 Member, Executive Board, Shoishob Bangladesh (NGO running non formal schools for child domestic labour).- 1995-2009
 Academic Director, Bangladesh Institute of Child Health, Dhaka Shishu (Children's) Hospital. - (2012-2013)
 National Co-ordinator, Establishment of Shishu Bikash Kendro in 14 Medical College Hospitals, HNPSP, under Improved Hospital Services Management Line Director, Office of the Director General of Health Services (DGHS), Ministry of Health and Family Welfare (MOHFW), Government of Bangladesh. (2008-2011)
 National Co-ordinator, Establishment of Shishu Bikash Kendro in Secondary and Tertiary Hospitals, under Health, Population & Nutrition Sector Development Program (HPNSDP), Hospital Services Management Line Director, Office of the Director General of Health Services (DGHS), Ministry of Health and Family Welfare (MOHFW), Government of Bangladesh. (2011-2018)
 Professor and Head, Department of Pediatric Neuroscience , Dhaka Shishu (Children's) Hospital (presently on sabbatical leave). (1998-2018)
 Founder Chairperson, Shishu Bikash Network (SBN), a network of multi-disciplinary professionals working in the field of paediatric neurosciences, neurodisability and child development). (2000-till date) 
 Co-convenor, Shasthya Andolon (Health Movement - a forum of health professionals, activists, lawyers, environmentalists, agriculturists, nutritionists and others engaging in discourse on various health issues and policies related to peoples' health). (2000-till date).
 Member, Faculty of Pediatrics, Bangladesh College of Physicians and Surgeons (BCPS). (2001-till date) 
 Secretary-General, Bangladesh Society for Child Neurology, Development and Disability (BSCNDD). (2006-till date)
 Member, Advisory Board, Bangladesh Health Watch. (2006-till date)
 General Secretary, Bangladesh Protibondhi Foundation (BPF). (2008-till date)
 President, Bangladesh Society for Clinical Electro Neurophysiologists (BSCENP). (2008-till date)
 Member, Board of Trustees, Quazi Nooruzzaman Trust. (2015-till date)

Chapters
 Nargis Islam, Nishat F. Rahman, Naila Z. Khan. Mental Health and Trauma in the Rohingya Camps. In Bangladesh Health Watch: Health Sector’s Response to The Rohingya Crisis, 2019.

Award
 “Successful Individual” (Shophol Bekti) Award on the 11th World Autism Awareness Day by the Honorable Prime Minister of Bangladesh under the aegis of the Ministry of Social Welfare, Government of Bangladesh.(2018)

References 

Living people
Bangladeshi medical researchers
Bangladeshi neurologists
Place of birth missing (living people)
Dhaka Medical College alumni
Year of birth missing (living people)